Carolina Eyck (born 26 December 1987) is a German-Sorb musician specialising in playing the Theremin, an electronic instrument. Her performances around the world have helped to promote the unusual musical instrument.

Biography

German-born musician and composer Carolina Eyck is one of the world's foremost theremin virtuosi. After her debut with the Berlin Philharmonic, she was invited to the Bohuslav Martinu International Music Festival in Basel, the Davos Festival (Switzerland), the Konzerthaus Berlin, the Großes Festspielhaus Salzburg (Austria), the Teatro Nacional Lisbon (Portugal) and the Palace of Arts Budapest. She has given concerts in Poland, the Czech Republic, Luxembourg, Sweden, Finland, Great Britain, Italy, Switzerland, Austria, Japan, Mexico, Chile, Portugal, Hungary, Pakistan, Turkey and the United States.
During her concert tours, Eyck has collaborated with other musicians and orchestras including Heinz Holliger, Robert Kolinsky, Gerhard Oppitz, Andrey Boreyko, Michael Sanderling, Gürer Aykal, John Storgårds, the Berlin Radio Symphony Orchestra, the Bern Symphony Orchestra, the Essen Philharmonic Orchestra, the Brandenburg State Orchestra, the Stuttgart Philharmonic Orchestra, the Lapland Chamber Orchestra, the Heidelberg Symphonic Orchestra and the Mozarteum Orchestra of Salzburg. She was guest musician of the Hamburg Ballet performing "The Little Mermaid" by Lera Auerbach in Japan and San Francisco. In 2012, Eyck played the theremin solo at the world premiere of the two symphonies "Mesopotamia" and "Universe" by Fazıl Say. Finnish composer Kalevi Aho dedicated a theremin concerto to Carolina which she performed for the first time in October 2012.
The theremin concerto "Dancefloor With Pulsing" by the French composer Regis Campo was written for Eyck and premiered with the Brussels Philharmonic in 2018.

In 2006, Eyck published the first extensive theremin method book entitled "The Art of Playing the Theremin". With her playing technique the player is able to tune the theremin to their hand and rely on their finger positions, rather than correcting notes after they are audible. Since 2010 she has been the artistic director of the Theremin Summer Academy in Colmar, France, and has since conducted workshops, lectures and master classes worldwide. Also in 2006 Eyck was the winner of the International Competition for Composers arranged by Radio/TV Berlin-Brandenburg in 2006. She has since conducted workshops, lectures and Masterclasses in Germany, Sweden, Poland, Great Britain, the United States of America, Mexico and Japan. In 2010, Eyck received her Bachelor of music degree in viola at the Royal College of Music, Stockholm, Sweden.

In 2015, she received the German Echo Klassik in the category "Concert Recording of the Year (20th/21st century music)" for playing the Theremin Concerto "Eight Seasons" by Kalevi Aho, conducted by John Storgårds and played with the Lapland Chamber Orchestra, published in 2014 by BIS records.

On 14 August 2020, Eyck appeared on the BBC Radio 3 programme In Tune to discuss the theremin.
During the show, she performed an excerpt from the self-composed tribute piece Friend as well as a complete version of the Doctor Who theme, the latter of which was recorded on video.

Compositions
 "Sciciani—Am wendischen Burgwall" Pictures for Accordion and Strings, world premiere on 16 September 2006 by the Cottbus Philharmonic Orchestra directed by GMD Reinhard Petersen, Soloist: Aidar Gainullin (Moskau)—Bajan
 "CIANI—Am wendischen Burgwall" Pictures for Theremin and Orchestra, world premiere on 4 February 2007 by the orchestra of the Musikgymnasium Carl Philipp Emanuel Bach (specialized high school for musicians) in the French Cathedral Berlin
 "Syllableaves" Concerto for Theremin and Orchestra, world premiere on 24 April 2010 by the Gävle Symfoniorkester directed by Fredrik Burstedt at the Konzerthaus Gävle (Sweden)
 "Sauselei" Duet for Viola and Voice (2010)
 "Fantasias" for Theremin and String Quartet (2015)

Discography

LPs
 Theremin (2008, Servi)
 Fazıl Say (2013, Imaj)
 Improvisations for Theremin and Piano (2014, Butterscotch Records)
 Theremin Sonatas (2015, Genuin) with Christopher Tarnow
 Fantasias for Theremin and String Quartet (2016, Butterscotch Records)
 Waves (2019, yeyeh)
 Elegies for Theremin & Voice (2019, Butterscotch Records)
 Thetis 2086 (2022 Neue Meister)

Singles and EPs
 Reja (2018, self-release)
 Elephant in Green (2019, self-release)
 Northern Lights (2020, self-release)

Live albums
 Kalevi Aho (2013, BIS) with Annu Salminen, John Storgård, and the Lapland Chamber Orchestra

Guest contributions
 Heinz Holliger Oboe Fantasy (2008, medici arts)
 Dante's Dream (2009, Kick The Flame) - track "Episodes"
 The Little Mermaid(2011, BFMI) - as the voice of the mermaid using theremin
 Cellosophy (2012, Timezone) - track "King of Atlantis"
 Clownwise film score by Petr Ostrouchov (2014, Fog'n'Desire Films)
 Die Erfindung der Liebe film score by Maciej Sledziecki (2015)
 Yeni Sarkilar (2015, Ada Music) - tracks 1, 2, and 4
 About April by Friend 'n Fellow (2015, Doctor Heart Music) - track "April"

Awards
Besides her engagements in the area of classical and contemporary music, Carolina loves improvising and composing. She was winner of the International Competition for Composers arranged by Radio/TV Berlin-Brandenburg in 2006.

In 2015, she received the German Echo Klassik in the category "Concert Recording of the Year (20th/21st century music)" for playing the Theremin Concerto "Eight Seasons" by Kalevi Aho, conducted by John Storgårds and played with the Lapland Chamber Orchestra, published in 2014 by BIS records.

Books
 Carolina Eyck: The Art of Playing the Theremin. SERVI Verlag, Berlin 2006, 
 Carolina Eyck: Die Kunst des Thereminspiels. SERVI Verlag, Berlin 2006, EAN 4025 1187 0631—German version

References

1987 births
Living people
Sorbian people
Theremin players
Women classical composers
Women in electronic music
21st-century German composers
21st-century classical musicians
21st-century women composers